The ATP test is a process of rapidly measuring actively growing microorganisms through detection of adenosine triphosphate, or ATP.

Method

ATP is a molecule found in and around living cells, and as such it gives a direct measure of biological concentration and health. ATP is quantified by measuring the light produced through its reaction with the naturally occurring firefly enzyme luciferase using a luminometer. The amount of light produced is directly proportional to the amount of ATP present in the sample.  

ATP tests can be used to: 

 Control biological treatment reactors
 Guide biocide dosing programs
 Determine drinking water cleanliness
 Manage fermentation processes
 Assess soil activity
 Determine corrosion / deposit process type
 Measure equipment or product sanitation

1st generation testing vs. 2nd generation testing

1st generation ATP tests are derived from hygiene monitoring uses where samples are relatively free of interferences. 2nd Generation tests are specifically designed for water, wastewater and industrial applications where, for the most part, samples contain a variety of components that can interfere with the ATP assay.

How ATP is measured

ATP is a molecule found only in and around living cells, and as such it gives a direct measure of biological concentration and health. ATP is quantified by measuring the light produced through its reaction with the naturally-occurring firefly enzyme luciferase using a luminometer. The amount of light produced is directly proportional to the amount of biological energy present in the sample.

Within a water sample containing microorganisms, there are two types of ATP:

 Intracellular ATP – ATP contained within living biological cells.
 Extracellular ATP – ATP located outside of biological cells that has been released from dead or stressed organisms.

Accurate measurement of these two types of ATP is critical to utilizing ATP-based measurements. Being able to accurately measure these different types of ATP offers the ability to assess biological health and activity, and subsequently control water and wastewater processes.

See also

 Adenosine triphosphate

References

https://meridian.allenpress.com/jfp/article/81/5/729/175086/Development-of-a-Novel-Hygiene-Monitoring-System

https://meridian.allenpress.com/jfp/article/85/7/1079/481183/A-Comprehensive-Analysis-of-ATP-Tests-Practical

External links
 Efficacy and Limitations of an ATP-Based Monitoring System

Microbiology techniques
Environmental chemistry
Water pollution